Indonesia and Tanzania established diplomatic relations in 1964. The relations between both nations are mostly in agriculture sector, where Indonesia provides training for Tanzanian farmers. In 2011 both countries established Indonesia-Tanzania Joint Agriculture Cooperation Committee (JACC), as a vehicle to improve agricultural sector co-operations, such as capacity building through training, joint research, and the expansion of market access to agricultural products.
Indonesia has an embassy in Dar es Salaam. Tanzania has a non-resident ambassador in Kuala Lumpur, Malaysia. Both countries are members of multilateral organisations such as World Trade Organization (WTO), the Group of 77 and Non-Aligned Movement.

History
The bilateral relations between Indonesia and Tanzania was established in 1964. In April 2005, Vice-President of Tanzania, Dr. Ali Mohammed Shein visited Indonesia to commemorate 50 years of the Asia-Africa Conference in Bandung. Indonesian Minister for Agriculture Anton Apriantono visited Tanzania in April 2007, reciprocated in September 2007 by his counterpart, the Tanzanian Minister for Agriculture visited Indonesia, which also signed the MoU on the Establishment of JACC (Joint Agricultural Cooperation Committee).

Agriculture co-operations
The relations between two countries mostly emphasise on agriculture sector. In 1996 Indonesia established Farmer's Agriculture and Rural Training Centre (FARTC) in Mkindo, Morogoro, Tanzania, where Indonesian agriculture experts provides training for Tanzanian farmers. However, because of austerity measures the program was terminated in 2004. In 2007 Minister of Agriculture of Tanzania visited his counterpart in Indonesia, requesting the resuming of FARTC program. In March 2011, Indonesian Government reactivated FARTC. For Indonesia, this agriculture assistance for Tanzania was motivated by the South–South cooperation and Non-Aligned Movement solidarity, which promote collective self-reliance especially in food security.

References

External links
Embassy of the Republic of Indonesia in Dar es Salaam, Tanzania

 
Tanzania
Bilateral relations of Tanzania